In mathematics, in the field of group theory, a contranormal subgroup is a subgroup whose
normal closure in the group is the whole group. Clearly, a contranormal subgroup can be normal only if it is the whole group.

Some facts:

 Every subgroup of a finite group is a contranormal subgroup of a subnormal subgroup. In general, every subgroup of a group is a contranormal subgroup of a descendant subgroup.
 Every abnormal subgroup is contranormal.

References

Bibliography

Subgroup properties